The 2018–19 Oregon Ducks men's basketball team represented the University of Oregon during the 2018–19 NCAA Division I men's basketball season. The Ducks, led by ninth-year head coach Dana Altman, played their home games at Matthew Knight Arena as members of the Pac–12 Conference. They finished the season with a 25-13 record, 10-8 in conference play, and finished tied for 4th in the Pac-12. Oregon won the Pac-12 tournament, upsetting the No. 1 seed Washington and receiving the conference's automatic bid to the NCAA tournament. Oregon entered the NCAA Tournament as a No. 12 seed and upset the No. 5 seed Wisconsin in the first round, beat UC Irvine in the Second Round before losing in the Sweet Sixteen to Virginia.

Previous season

The Ducks finished the season 23–13, 10–8 in Pac-12 play to finish in a tie for sixth place. As the No. 6 seed in the Pac-12 tournament, they defeated Washington State in the first round and Utah in the quarterfinals before being defeated by USC in the semifinals. They received an invitation to the National Invitation Tournament, where they defeated Rider in the first round before losing to Marquette in the second round.

Off-season

Departures

Incoming transfers

2018 recruiting class

Roster

 Jan. 2, 2019 - Sophomore Forward, Abu Kigab elected to transfer.
 Jan. 3, 2019 - Freshman Center, Bol Bol out for remainder of season with a left foot injury.

Schedule and results

|-
!colspan=12 style=| Exhibition

|-
!colspan=12 style=| Non-conference regular season

|-
!colspan=12 style=|  Pac-12 regular season

|-
!colspan=12 style=| Pac-12 Tournament

|-
!colspan=12 style=| NCAA tournament

Ranking movement 

*AP does not release post-NCAA tournament rankings.^Coaches did not release a Week 1 poll.

References

Oregon Ducks men's basketball seasons
Oregon
Oregon Ducks men's basketball
Oregon Ducks men's basketball
Oregon
Pac-12 Conference men's basketball tournament championship seasons